Md Shamsud doha Sabbir is a Communist Party of Bangladesh politician and the former Member of Parliament of Nilphamari-2.

Career
Shamsuddoha was elected to parliament from Nilphamari-2 as a Communist Party of Bangladesh candidate in 1991.

References

Communist Party of Bangladesh politicians
Living people
5th Jatiya Sangsad members
Year of birth missing (living people)